This is a list of lighthouses in Gabon.

Lighthouses

See also
List of lighthouses in Equatorial Guinea (to the north)
List of lighthouses in the Republic of the Congo (to the south)
 Lists of lighthouses and lightvessels

References

External links

Gabon
Lighthouses
Lighthouses